Borislav Batikov (born 25 May 1959) is a Bulgarian modern pentathlete. He competed at the 1980 Summer Olympics.

References

1959 births
Living people
Bulgarian male modern pentathletes
Olympic modern pentathletes of Bulgaria
Modern pentathletes at the 1980 Summer Olympics